Chidambara Rahasya is a novel written by Poornachandra Tejaswi. This novel depicts the state of a small Indian village in humorous manner. This book has murder investigation, caste system, communal riots, blind beliefs, love story, cardamom plants, friendship, youth rebels, land lords, untouchables, politics of the village.
In 2006, Girish Karnad made a teleserial based on the novel This book won the Sahitya Akademi Award for Kannada in 1987. It was translated into English by P. P. Giridhar as The Inscrutable Mystery. The translation was published by Sahitya Akademi.

References

Kannada novels
1985 novels
1985 Indian novels
Indian novels adapted into television shows
Sahitya Akademi Award-winning works